Robin Söderling defeated Gaël Monfils in the final, 6–1, 7–6(7–1) to win the singles tennis title at the 2010 Paris Masters.

Novak Djokovic was the defending champion, but lost in the third round to Michaël Llodra.

Seeds
All seeds received a bye into the second round.

Draw

Finals

Top half

Section 1

Section 2

Bottom half

Section 3

Section 4

Qualifying

Seeds

Qualifiers

Lucky loser

Draw

First qualifier

Second qualifier

Third qualifier

Fourth qualifier

Fifth qualifier

Sixth qualifier

External links
Main Draw
Qualifying Draw

Bnp Paribas Masters - Singles
Singles